A Zeeuwse bolus or Zeeuwse bolussen is a sweet pastry of Jewish origin from the Dutch province of Zeeland. They are made by baking a white bread dough rolled in dark brown sugar in a spiral shape, lemon zest (rare and only in some parts of the region) and cinnamon. The shape of a bolus differs between bakers. They are often eaten with coffee, and in some parts of the region the flatter underside is covered with butter.

There is also another kind of pastry that is sold under the name Bolus or boles in the Netherlands. These are ginger boles, made of dough filled with ginger, and orangeade boles filled with orangeade and almond meal flavoured with orange and almonds. These boles are a golden yellow colour and in a paper form. They have to be eaten with a spoon because the syrup makes them very sticky.

History
The bolus was first created in Zeeland in the first half of the 17th century by Sephardic Jewish bakers, mainly from the Portuguese region of Alentejo. There are signs of the Portuguese Jewish community that inhabited Zeeland at the Jewish cemetery in Middelburg. These Jewish bakers created the predecessor of the Zeeuwse bolus. Later bakers from Zeeland perfected the art of the bolus, sometimes using steam ovens to keep the cinnamon pastry tender.

Competition

Until 1998, in baking competitions, boluses were judged as well as bread, cakes and other pastries.

Since 1998, every year during the "bolus week", on the Tuesday of the 12th week of the year, the Bolusbaking Championships Zeeland are held, organised by the Dutch Bakery Centre. Participating bakers may get eight boluses judged. A jury consisting of two bakers and two Zeelandia employees chooses the best ten products and the winner is chosen from these by the audience. The winner receives the Bolus Trophy and may call themselves "Best Bolus Baker" for a year. Some of the winners were: Iman Izeboud from Koudekerke (2002), Jan Dees from Zaamslag (he won in 1989, 2004 and 2009), Mr. Bliek from Middelburg (2005), Wilfred Droppers from Zierikzee (2007) mr. Voordijk from Goes, 2008.

International
The bolus is seen as an originally Jewish pastry and has been spread all over the globe during the diaspora. Boluses also get sold in Jerusalem, Moscow and in Paris and the south of France.

Etymology
The word bolus comes from Yiddish. The Dutch Van Dale etymological dictionary says that the word bolus or boles is the plural of bole, which comes from the Spanish bollo meaning bun, or bola which means "ball".

References

External links 
 

Buns
Dutch pastries
Sweet breads
Culture of Zeeland